Central R. Co. of N. J. v. Mills, 113 U.S. 249 (1885), involved a case where the Court of Claims had dismissed a petition of the claimants, regarding the rejection of two items sued for: (1) labor done and materials furnished by the claimants in constructing the coffer dams, and in performing the work necessarily connected therewith and preliminary to the masonry work for the piers and abutments, (2) loss and damages resulting to the claimants in consequence of the reduction of the dimensions of the piers and abutments made subsequently to the making of the contract.

Background

The decision of the Court of Claims in regard to item (1) was that the claimants had not shown that the written contract did not express the intent of both parties as to the coffer dams, and that even if that court were satisfied that the claimants executed the contract in mistake of their rights, there was no evidence that the defendants shared the mistake. Its decision in regard to item (2) was that it would be disposed to regard the case, on the facts, as one for equitable interposition for the purpose of further inquiry and the ascertainment of the rights of the parties in equity if it had jurisdiction, but that the statute did not authorize it to entertain those considerations, because, in the proceedings before it, it could hear and determine only claims for labor done and materials furnished by the claimants under their contract with the defendants.

Opinion of the Court

The Supreme Court held that the ruling of the Court of Claims in regard to item (1)—the coffer dams—was erroneous, and that by the actual contract between the parties the claimants were not to do any of the work covered by the claim made by them under item (1), and that the written contract must be reformed accordingly. As to item (2), this Court held, that the Court of Claims placed too limited a construction upon the special act of Congress, and that its power, under that act, extended to reforming the contract in respect to permitting the officers of the United States to materially vary the plans for the piers so as to essentially change the obligations of the parties.

The decree of the Court of Claims was reversed, and the cause was remanded, with directions to proceed in it according to law and in conformity with the opinion of this Court. This cause was remanded to the Court of Claims, with a direction to enter judgment accordingly.

See also
List of United States Supreme Court cases, volume 113

References

External links
 

United States Supreme Court cases
United States Supreme Court cases of the Waite Court
1885 in United States case law
Central Railroad of New Jersey
Railway litigation in 1885